Leandro Rodrigues (born 31 January 1982) is a Brazilian football striker who plays for Veranópolis Esporte Clube Recreativo e Cultural.

Career

Born in Guarulhos, Brazil, he begin playing in the youth teams of Mirassol in 1999. In 2001, he moved abroad and made his senior debut playing with Oita Trinita in the J2 League. After that season in Japan, he was back to Brazil playing with São Caetano in the Campeonato Brasileiro Série A during 2002. The club had just been league vice-champions two years in the row, and it was no surprise that they reached the Copa Libertadores final that year, although Leandro was not part of the teams that played the final.

In 2003 Leandro signed with Mogi Mirim where he will play until mid-2004 in the Série B, when he returned to lower league Mirassol to play until the end of the year. He started 2005 playing with Grêmio Barueri in the Série C, but finished the year playing with Iraty, a club that signed him on a long-term contract.

In 2006, he was loaned to the all-mighty Santos FC winning with them the Campeonato Paulista and finishing 4th in the Série A.

He was loaned to Grêmio Barueri in July 2007.

In 2008, he was loaned to Ponte Preta playing with them in the Campeonato Brasileiro Série B. In this period he also played with Swedish side Kalmar FF.
In 2010, he was loaned to Canoas (sometimes referred as Ulbra – RS) and in 2011 to Chapecoense.

On 9 July 2012, Leandro signed with Hong Kong outfit South China. He started for them in the first 4 league matches of the 2012–13 season, scoring once in a 2–2 draw against Sunray Cave JC Sun Hei. However, the club's signing of another Brazilian striker Mauro made Leandro expendable. He wasn't included in South China's playing list for the league match against Wofoo Tai Po on 7 October, and was subsequently released right after the match.

Club statistics

Honours
São Caetano
Copa Libertadores runner-up: 2002

Barueri
Campeonato Paulista Série A2: 2005

Santos
Campeonato Paulista: 2006

References

External links
 
 

1982 births
Living people
People from Guarulhos
Brazilian footballers
Brazilian expatriate footballers
Association football forwards
Santos FC players
Iraty Sport Club players
Grêmio Barueri Futebol players
Mirassol Futebol Clube players
Mogi Mirim Esporte Clube players
Associação Desportiva São Caetano players
Associação Atlética Ponte Preta players
Associação Chapecoense de Futebol players
Brusque Futebol Clube players
Oita Trinita players
J2 League players
Expatriate footballers in Japan
Kalmar FF players
Allsvenskan players
Expatriate footballers in Sweden
South China AA players
Hong Kong First Division League players
Expatriate footballers in Hong Kong
Footballers from São Paulo (state)